Hjärtats hjältar ("The Heroes of the Heart") was the 2004 edition of Sveriges Radio's Christmas Calendar.

Plot
Julius and Juliana are twins. Julius wants to become a better ice hockey player. He practices a lot, not even caring for Christmas. Worried, Juliana visits the school nurse Vera, who says practicing to hard is dangerous. Vera has invented a shrinking machine, which she shows Juliana. Juliana is shrunk down and enters Julius' body travelling inside small a yellow, submarine-like vehicle.

References
 

2004 radio programme debuts
2004 radio programme endings
Fiction about size change
Sports fiction
Sveriges Radio's Christmas Calendar